The Matti Keinonen Trophy is an ice hockey award given by the Finnish Liiga to the "most effective player" of the season, i.e. the player with the best plus/minus rating.

Trophy winners

References

Finnish awards
Liiga trophies and awards